Muriel Ellen Rahn (1911–1961) was an American vocalist and actress. She co-founded the Rose McClendon Players with her husband, Dick Campbell and was one of the leading black concert singers of the mid-20th Century. She is perhaps best known for her starring role in the original Broadway production of Carmen Jones. Rahn also served as musical director of the German State Theater in Frankfurt.

Biography
Muriel Ellen Rahn was born in Boston in 1911, the daughter of Willie and Elizabeth "Bessie" Rahn (née Smith). After her father died, she moved with her mother to New York City, where Bessie met and married Cornelius M. Battey, who became director of photography of the Tuskegee Institute in Alabama. Muriel finished her high school at Tuskegee, then attended Atlanta University before earning a degree from the Music Conservatory of the University of Nebraska, Lincoln. She was also educated at Columbia University and studied voice at Juilliard School of Music.

In 1929, she launched her professional career in New York City. One of her earlier appearances on Broadway was in the musical, Come of Age written and staged by Clamence Dane with music by Richard Addinsell.
  
In 1950, Rahn made one of her last appearances on Broadway.  Opposite operatic legend Lawrence Tibbett, she played the role of Cora Lewis in the musical, The Barrier, based on the play, Mulatto by Langston Hughes.

Later stage credits included the off-Broadway production of Sara Reavin's melodrama, The Ivory Branch with Diana Barrymore.
In 1959, Rahn became the first black musical director of the Städtische Bühnen Frankfurt, Germany.

Rahn died on August 8, 1961 at Sydenham Hospital in New York City from lung cancer.

Selected credits

Theatre

Television

Motion Pictures

References

External links

 

1911 births
1961 deaths
African-American actresses
Deaths from lung cancer in New York (state)
Musicians from Boston
20th-century American actresses
Actresses from Boston
20th-century African-American women singers